is a former freestyle swimmer from Japan, who competed for her native country at the 1996 Summer Olympics in Atlanta, Georgia. There she finished in fourth place in the 4 × 200 m freestyle relay, alongside Aiko Miyake, Eri Yamanoi, and Suzu Chiba.

In 2020, Imoto received the Olympic Flame in a ceremony in Greece to be transferred to Japan for the 2020 Summer Olympics.

References
 Japanese Olympic Committee

1976 births
Living people
Japanese female freestyle swimmers
Swimmers at the 1990 Asian Games
Swimmers at the 1994 Asian Games
Swimmers at the 1996 Summer Olympics
Olympic swimmers of Japan
Place of birth missing (living people)
Asian Games medalists in swimming
Asian Games gold medalists for Japan
Asian Games silver medalists for Japan
Asian Games bronze medalists for Japan
Medalists at the 1990 Asian Games
Medalists at the 1994 Asian Games
Universiade medalists in swimming
Universiade bronze medalists for Japan
Medalists at the 1995 Summer Universiade
20th-century Japanese women